Rudolf Matek (born 1898, date of death unknown) was a Romanian footballer who played as a striker.

International career
Rudolf Matek played three friendly matches for Romania, scoring one goal in his last game played, a 3–1 victory against Turkey.

Scores and results table. Romania's goal tally first:

Honours
Chinezul Timișoara
Divizia A: 1921–22, 1922–23, 1923–24, 1924–25, 1925–26, 1926–27

Notes

References

External links
 

1898 births
Year of death missing
Romanian footballers
Romania international footballers
Place of birth missing
Association football forwards
Liga I players
Chinezul Timișoara players